is a town located in Aomori Prefecture, Japan. , the town had an estimated population of 12,249 in 6313 households, and a population density of 150 persons per km2.

Geography
Noheji occupies the southeastern coastline of Mutsu Bay at the base of the Shimokita Peninsula.

Neighboring municipalities
Aomori Prefecture
Yokohama
Tōhoku
Rokkasho
Hiranai

Climate
The town has a cold maritime climate characterized by cool short summers and long cold winters with heavy snowfall  (Köppen climate classification Cfa).  The average annual temperature in Noheji is 10.1 °C. The average annual rainfall is 1243 mm with September as the wettest month. The temperatures are highest on average in August, at around 22.7 °C, and lowest in January, at around -2.1 °C.

Demographics
Per Japanese census data, the population of Noheji peaked in around the year 1970 and has declined over the past 50 years.

History
The area around Noheji was inhabited by the Emishi people until the historical period, and the name "Noheji" is derived from "Nosobechi", or "place where a pure river flows through a field" in the Ainu language. During the Edo period, the area was controlled by the Nanbu clan of Morioka Domain and prospered due to its fishing industry and location on the road connecting Morioka Domain with the Hirosaki Domain. During the Boshin War of the Meiji Restoration, the Battle of Noheji occurred between the Tokugawa loyalist forces of Morioka Domain and pro-imperial forces of Hirosaki Domain on 11 November 1868, resulting in a victory for the Imperial faction. During the post-Meiji restoration creation of the modern municipalities system on 1 April 1889, the village of Noheiji was established. Noheji was elevated to town status on 28 August 1898.

Government
Noheji has a mayor-council form of government with a directly elected mayor and a unicameral town council of 12 members. Noheji is part of Shimokita District which contributes four members to the Aomori Prefectural Assembly. In terms of national politics, the town is part of Aomori 2nd district of the lower house of the Diet of Japan.

Economy
The economy of Noheji is heavily dependent on commercial fishing, especially for scallops, and on agriculture with the raising of mountain yams predominating. The town also serves as a commercial and transportation center for the surrounding rural areas.

Education
Noheji has three public elementary schools and one public middle school operated by the town government, and one public high school operated by the Aomori Prefectural Board of Education. The town also has one private high school.

Transportation

Railway
  Aoimori Railway Company - Aoimori Railway Line
 
East Japan Railway Company (JR East) - Ōminato Line
  -  -

Highway
  Shimokita Expressway

  (unsigned)

Local attractions
Makado Onsen, a hot spring and ski resort

Noted people from Noheji
Tsuyoshi Ichinohe, skier
Takaya Eguchi, modern dancer
Gaku Shibasaki, footballer

References

External links
Official Website 

Towns in Aomori Prefecture
Populated coastal places in Japan
Noheji, Aomori